Udtja is a Sami reindeer herding camp in Jokkmokk Municipality, in the county of Norrbotten in Sweden.

References 

Populated places in Norrbotten County